William John Stapley (1887–1964) was an English footballer who played as a centre-half in the Football League for Glossop.

Stapley started his career at Dulwich Hamlet. He then moved to West Ham United but failed to make an appearance for the Southern League team.

He joined Second Division club Glossop in 1908, along with his brother Harry. He played 120 League games for the Derbyshire club, scoring one goal.

He appeared once for England Amateurs, in a match against the Netherlands on 21 December 1907. The match, which is recognized as a full international by the Dutch FA, was won by England 12–2, and Stapley scored five times. His brother Harry also played for England Amateurs, netting over 20 goals for the team.

References

1887 births
1964 deaths
People from Southborough, Kent
Footballers from Kent
English footballers
England amateur international footballers
Association football central defenders
Dulwich Hamlet F.C. players
West Ham United F.C. players
Glossop North End A.F.C. players
English Football League players